Molality is a measure of the number of moles of solute in a solution corresponding to 1 kg or 1000 g of solvent. This contrasts with the definition of molarity which is based on a specified volume of solution.

A commonly used unit for molality in chemistry is mol/kg. A solution of concentration 1 mol/kg is also sometimes denoted as 1 molal. The unit mol/kg requires that molar mass be expressed in kg/mol, instead of the usual g/mol or kg/kmol.

Definition
The molality (b), of a solution is defined as the amount of substance (in moles) of solute, nsolute, divided by the mass (in kg) of the solvent, msolvent:

In the case of solutions with more than one solvent, molality can be defined for the mixed solvent considered as a pure pseudo-solvent. Instead of mole solute per kilogram solvent as in the binary case, units are defined as mole solute per kilogram mixed solvent.

Origin 
The term molality is formed in analogy to molarity which is the molar concentration of a solution. The earliest known use of the intensive property molality and of its adjectival unit, the now-deprecated molal, appears to have been published by G. N. Lewis and M. Randall in the 1923 publication of Thermodynamics and the Free Energies of Chemical Substances. Though the two terms are subject to being confused with one another, the molality and molarity of a dilute aqueous solution are nearly the same, as one kilogram of water (solvent) occupies the volume of 1 liter at room temperature and a small amount of solute has little effect on the volume.

Unit 
The SI unit for molality is moles per kilogram of solvent.

A solution with a molality of 3 mol/kg is often described as "3 molal", "3 m" or "3 m". However, following the SI system of units, the National Institute of Standards and Technology, the United States authority on measurement, considers the term "molal" and the unit symbol "m" to be obsolete, and suggests mol/kg or a related unit of the SI.

Usage considerations

Advantages 
The primary advantage of using molality as a measure of concentration is that molality only depends on the masses of solute and solvent, which are unaffected by variations in temperature and pressure. In contrast, solutions prepared volumetrically (e.g. molar concentration or mass concentration) are likely to change as temperature and pressure change. In many applications, this is a significant advantage because the mass, or the amount, of a substance is often more important than its volume (e.g. in a limiting reagent problem).

Another advantage of molality is the fact that the molality of one solute in a solution is independent of the presence or absence of other solutes.

Problem areas 
Unlike all the other compositional properties listed in "Relation" section (below), molality depends on the choice of the substance to be called “solvent” in an arbitrary mixture. If there is only one pure liquid substance in a mixture, the choice is clear, but not all solutions are this clear-cut: in an alcohol–water solution, either one could be called the solvent; in an alloy, or solid solution, there is no clear choice and all constituents may be treated alike. In such situations, mass or mole fraction is the preferred compositional specification.

Relation to other compositional quantities 
In what follows, the solvent may be given the same treatment as the other constituents of the solution, such that the molality of the solvent of an n-solute solution, say b0, is found to be nothing more than the reciprocal of its molar mass, M0 (expressed as kg/mol):

For the solutes the expression of molalities is similar:

The expressions linking molalities to mass fractions and mass concentrations contain the molar masses of the solutes Mi:

Similarly the equalities below are obtained from the definitions of the molalities and of the other compositional quantities.

The mole fraction of solvent can be obtained from the definition by dividing the numerator and denominator to the amount of solvent n0:

Then the sum of ratios of the other mole amounts to the amount of solvent is substituted with expressions from below containing molalities:

giving the result

Mass fraction
The conversions to and from the mass fraction, w1, of the solute in a single-solute solution are

where b1 is the molality and M1 is the molar mass of the solute.

More  generally, for an n-solute/one-solvent solution, letting bi and wi be, respectively, the molality and mass fraction of the i-th solute,

where Mi is the molar mass of the ith solute, and w0 is the mass fraction of the solvent, which is expressible both as a function of the molalities as well as a function of the other mass fractions,

Substitution gives:

Mole fraction 
The conversions to and from the mole fraction, x1 mole fraction of the solute in a single-solute solution are

where M0 is the molar mass of the solvent.

More generally, for an n-solute/one-solvent solution, letting xi be the mole fraction of the ith solute,

where x0 is the mole fraction of the solvent, expressible both as a function of the molalities as well as a function of the other mole fractions:

Substitution gives:

Molar concentration (molarity)
The conversions to and from the molar concentration, c1, for one-solute solutions are

where ρ is the mass density of the solution, b1 is the molality, and M1 is the molar mass (in kg/mol) of the solute.

For solutions with n solutes, the conversions are

where the molar concentration of the solvent c0 is expressible both as a function of the molalities as well as a function of the other molarities:

Substitution gives:

Mass concentration 
The conversions to and from the mass concentration, ρsolute, of a single-solute solution are

or

where ρ is the mass density of the solution, b1 is the molality, and M1 is the molar mass of the solute.

For the general n-solute solution, the mass concentration of the ith solute, ρi, is related to its molality, bi, as follows:

where the mass concentration of the solvent, ρ0, is expressible both as a function of the molalities as well as a function of the other mass concentrations:

Substitution gives:

Equal ratios 
Alternatively, one may use just the last two equations given for the compositional property of the solvent in each of the preceding sections, together with the relationships given below, to derive the remainder of properties in that set:

where i and j are subscripts representing all the constituents, the n solutes plus the solvent.

Example of conversion 
An acid mixture consists of 0.76, 0.04, and 0.20 mass fractions of 70% HNO3, 49% HF, and H2O, where the percentages refer to mass fractions of the bottled acids carrying a balance of H2O. The first step is determining the mass fractions of the constituents:

The approximate molar masses in kg/mol are

First derive the molality of the solvent, in mol/kg,

and use that to derive all the others by use of the equal ratios:

Actually, bH2O cancels out, because it is not needed. In this case, there is a more direct equation: we use it to derive the molality of HF:

The mole fractions may be derived from this result:

Osmolality 
Osmolality is a variation of molality that takes into account only solutes that contribute to a solution's osmotic pressure. It is measured in osmoles of the solute per kilogram of water. This unit is frequently used in medical laboratory results in place of osmolarity, because it can be measured simply by depression of the freezing point of a solution, or cryoscopy (see also: osmostat and colligative properties).

Relation to apparent (molar) properties 
Molality appears in the expression of the apparent (molar) volume of a solute as a function of the molality b of that solute (and density of the solution and solvent):

For multicomponent systems the relation is slightly modified by the sum of molalities of solutes. Also a total molality and a mean apparent molar volume can be defined for the solutes together and also a mean molar mass of the solutes as if they were a single solute. In this case the first equality from above is modified with the mean molar mass M of the pseudosolute instead of the molar mass of the single solute:

, 

, yi,j being ratios involving molalities of solutes i,j and the total molality bT.

The sum of products molalities - apparent molar volumes of solutes in their binary solutions equals the product between the sum of molalities of solutes and apparent molar volume in ternary or multicomponent solution.

,

Relation to apparent molar properties and activity coefficients 

For concentrated ionic solutions the activity coefficient of the electrolyte is split into electric and statistical components.

The statistical part includes molality b, hydration index number h, the number of ions from the dissociation and the ratio ra between the apparent molar volume of the electrolyte and the molar volume of water.

Concentrated solution statistical part of the activity coefficient is:

Molalities of a ternary or multicomponent solution 
The molalities of solutes b1, b2 in a ternary solution obtained by mixing two binary aqueous solutions with different solutes (say a sugar and a salt or two different salts) are different than the initial molalities of the solutes bii in their binary solutions.

The content of solvent in mass fractions w01 and w02 from each solution of masses ms1 and ms2 to be mixed as a function of initial molalities is calculated. Then the amount (mol) of solute from each binary solution is divided by the sum of masses of water after mixing:

Mass fractions of each solute in the initial solutions w11 and w22
are expressed as a function of the initial molalities b11, b22 :

These expressions of mass fractions are substituted in the final molalitaties.

The results for a ternary solution can be extended to a multicomponent solution (with more than two solutes).

From the molalities of the binary solutions 

The molalities of the solutes in a ternary solution can be expressed also from molalities in the binary solutions and their masses:

The binary solution molalities are:

The masses of the solutes determined from the molalities of the solutes and the masses of water can be substituted in the expressions of the masses of solutions:

Similarly for the mass of the second solution:

From here one can obtain the masses of water to be summed in the denominator of the molalitities of the solutes in the ternary solutions.

Thus the ternary molalities are:

See also 
 Molarity

References 

Chemical properties

es:Concentración#Molalidad